"Don't Change" is a song by Australian rock band INXS. It was released as a single from the album Shabooh Shoobah in October 1982. It has been described as the band's first international single.

Reception
Cash Box reviewed the "Don't Change" single saying "churning rhythms and swirling guitars provide a straight ahead forward thrust for singer Michael Hutchence's philosophical pronouncements."

"Don't Change" peaked at number 14 on the Australian Singles Charts  and reached number 80 on the Billboard Hot 100 and number 17 on the Billboard Top Tracks chart.

In February 2014, after the Channel 7 screening of INXS: Never Tear Us Apart mini-series, "Don't Change" charted again in Australia via download sales. It peaked at #92 on the ARIA Singles Chart.

In 2017, the song was selected for preservation in the National Film and Sound Archive's Sounds of Australia collection.

In January 2018, as part of Triple M's "Ozzest 100", the 'most Australian' songs of all time, "Don't Change" was ranked number 28.

Music video
The music video, directed by Scott Hicks, was originally planned to be filmed on an airport runway, in South Australia, but was cancelled due to a bad weather and filming took place in a nearby airport hangar.

Hutchence knew Hicks, and had performed on two songs included on the soundtrack of an earlier feature film directed by him, Freedom. The two tracks, "Speed Kills" and "Forest Theme", were written by Don Walker (Cold Chisel). "Speed Kills" was Hutchence's first solo single and was released by WEA in early 1982.

Uses in media and other versions
"Don't Change" plays during the credits of the movie Adventureland and is featured on its soundtrack.

The song has been covered by Brandon Flowers, The Audreys, The Bravery, Everclear, Face to Face, Goo Goo Dolls, Grinspoon, AFI, Bruce Springsteen, Lazlo Bane and Limp Bizkit.

Track listing
7" single Track listing

Charts

References

External links
 "Don't Change" at Discogs

1982 songs
1982 singles
INXS songs
Warner Music Group singles
Songs written by Michael Hutchence
Songs written by Andrew Farriss
Songs written by Jon Farriss
Songs written by Tim Farriss
Songs written by Garry Gary Beers
Songs written by Kirk Pengilly
Song recordings produced by Mark Opitz